Austdalsvatnet is a lake in the northwestern part of Luster Municipality in Vestland county, Norway. It is located in the Breheimen mountain range at the end of the Austdalsbreen glacier, just north of the lake Styggevatnet. The water is regulated by a dam on lake Styggevatnet and it empties into the Jostedøla river which flows south into the Gaupnefjord (part of the Sognefjord).

See also
List of lakes in Norway

References

Lakes of Vestland
Luster, Norway
Reservoirs in Norway